Hicham is a given name that may refer to:
 Hicham Aaboubou (born 1978), Moroccan soccer player
 Hicham Aboucherouane (born 1981), Moroccan football striker
 Hicham Arazi (born 1973), Moroccan tennis player
 Hicham Bellani (born 1979), Moroccan runner
 Hicham Bouaouiche (born 1974), Moroccan long-distance runner
 Hicham El Guerrouj (born 1974), Moroccan middle-distance runner
 Hicham El-Mashtoub (born 1972), Lebanese player of gridiron football
 Hicham Louissi (born 1976), Moroccan footballer
 Hicham Mahdoufi (born 1983), Moroccan footballer
 Hicham Mezair (born 1976), Algerian footballer
 Hicham Mesbahi (born 1980), Moroccan boxer
 Hicham Zerouali (1977–2004), Moroccan footballer who played for Aberdeen

See also 

 Hisham (name)
 Hesham